Waterloo is a city in and the county seat of Black Hawk County, Iowa, United States. As of the 2020 United States Census the population was 67,314, making it the eighth-largest city in the state. The city is part of the Waterloo – Cedar Falls Metropolitan Statistical Area, and is the more populous of the two cities.

History

Waterloo was originally known as Prairie Rapids Crossing. The town was established near two Meskwaki American tribal seasonal camps alongside the Cedar River. It was first settled in 1845 when George and Mary Melrose Hanna and their children arrived on the east bank of the Red Cedar River (now just called the Cedar River). They were followed by the Virden and Mullan families in 1846. Evidence of these earliest families can still be found in the street names Hanna Boulevard, Mullan Avenue and Virden Creek.

On December 8, 1845, the Iowa State Register and Waterloo Herald was the first newspaper published in Waterloo.

The name Waterloo supplanted the original name, Prairie Rapids Crossing, shortly after Charles Mullan petitioned for a post office in the town. Since the signed petition did not include the name of the proposed post office location, Mullan was charged with selecting the name when he submitted the petition. Tradition has it that as he flipped through a list of other post offices in the United States, he came upon the name Waterloo. The name struck his fancy, and a post office was established under that name. There were two extended periods of rapid growth over the next 115 years. From 1895 to 1915, the population increased from 8,490 to 33,097, a 290% increase. From 1925 to 1960, population increased from 36,771 to 71,755. The 1895 to 1915 period was a time of rapid growth in manufacturing, rail transportation and wholesale operations. During this period the Waterloo Gasoline Traction Engine Company moved to Waterloo and, shortly after, the Rath Packing Company moved from Dubuque. Another major employer throughout the first two-thirds of the 20th century was the Illinois Central Railroad. Among the others was the less-successful brass era automobile manufacturer, the Maytag-Mason Motor Company.

On June 7, 1934, bank robber Tommy Carroll had a shootout with the FBI when he and his wife stopped to pick up gas. Accidentally parking next to a police car and wasting time dropping his gun and picking it back up, Carroll was forced to flee into an alley, where he was shot. He was taken to Allen Memorial Hospital in Waterloo, where he soon died.

Waterloo suffered in the agricultural recession of the 1980s; its major employers at the time were heavily rooted in agriculture. John Deere, the area's largest employer, cut 10,000 jobs, and the Rath meatpacking plant closed altogether, losing 2,500 jobs. It is estimated that Waterloo lost 14% of its population during this time. Today the city enjoys a broader industrial base, as city leaders have sought to diversify its industrial and commercial mix. Deere remains a strong presence in the city, but employs only roughly one-third the number of people it did at its peak.

African American community 
In 1910, a significant number of black railroad workers were brought in as strikebreakers to the Waterloo area. Black workers were relegated to 20 square blocks in Waterloo, an area that remains the east side to this day. In 1940, more black strikebreakers were brought in to work in the Rath meat plant. In 1948, a black strikebreaker killed a white union member. Instead of a race riot, a strike ensued against the Rath Company. The National Guard was called in to end the 73-day strike.

Civil rights 
United Packinghouse Workers of America became the main union of the Rath Company, welcoming black workers, but United Auto Workers Local 838 continued to refuse black members. With the power of the union, Anna Mae Weems, Ada Treadwell, Charles Pearson and Jimmy Porter formed an anti-discrimination department at Rath by the 1950s. This department helped organize protests against local places that discriminated against blacks.

Porter would go on to organize the first black radio station in Waterloo, KBBG, in 1978. Weems became the head of the anti-discrimination department and local NAACP chapter.

On May 31, 1966, Eddie Wallace Sallis was found dead in the local jail. The black community felt the death was suspicious, and protests were held. On June 4, Weems led a march on city hall to encourage investigation into his death. The march led to the creation of the Waterloo Human Rights Commission, which lasted only a year due to lack of funding.

On Sept. 7, 1967, a city report, "Waterloo's Unfinished Business", was released. The report covered the ongoing problems in housing, education and employment faced by Waterloo's black community. It confirmed the housing bias faced by black residents, that many of the schools were generally 80% of one race, and that 80% of black residents held service jobs. In a 2007 article, the Courier covered some changes in the 40 years since, finding that housing was now mostly divided by socioeconomic status, schools still violated the desegregation plan, and black unemployment was still double that of white residents.

The Iowa Supreme Court outlawed school segregation in 1868. A 1967 commission found most schools were still segregated and recommended immediate desegregation, which Mayor Lloyd Turner opposed. In 1969, the Waterloo school board voted to allow open enrollment in all their schools to encourage integration. Many parents felt it was not enough. Despite the efforts between 1967 and 1970, already-black schools in the area increased in their segregation.

Protests and riots 
By the 1960s, Rath was declining and jobs there were harder to come by. A federal government program trained 1,200 local youths with the promise of summer jobs, only to hire two as bricklayers. Starting in the summer months of 1966, Waterloo was subject to riots over race relations between the white community and the black community. Many white residents expressed confusion as to why riots were occurring in Waterloo, while younger black residents felt they were being treated unfairly, as their conditions seemed worse than those of their white neighbors. In 1967, the black population of Waterloo was equivalent to 8%, and according to the Courier, had a 4% unemployment rate. Waterloo was segregated at the time, as 95% of its black population lived in "East" Waterloo. While the white community felt East High was integrated with a 45% black student body, the black community pointed out that the elementary school in East Waterloo had only one white pupil.

Protests were mostly organized by black youths aged 16–25. Protests became riots when the youth felt protesting wasn't effective. Protests turned into riots in July 1968 and reached a critical mass by September, with buildings on East 4th street torched and vandalized.

In August 1968, East High students Terri and Kathy Pearson gave the principal a list of grievances detailing how they felt the discrimination could be lessened. The principal refused to implement any of the requested changes. Student protests and walkouts continued through September. Students were angry that no African American history course was being taught, and that interracial dating was discouraged by teachers and administrators.

On Sep 13, 1968, during an East High School football game, police attempted to arrest a black youth. He resisted arrest, drawing attention of students in the stands. Black students fought and argued with the police, and police responded by using clubs and mace. The riot continued into the east side of Waterloo, with a subsequent fire that claimed a lumber mill and three homes. There was an attempt to set East High on fire as well. The riot lasted until midnight and resulted in seven officers injured and thirteen youths jailed. The National Guard was called in the following day. The riots were called off and a solution was reached thanks to civil rights leader William G Parker.

Present day 
In 2003, Governor Tom Vilsack created a task force to close the racial achievement gap in Waterloo. In 2009, a fair housing report, "Analysis of Impediments to Fair Housing Choice", compiled by Mullin & Lonergan Associates Inc., found Waterloo to be Iowa's most segregated city.  "Historical patterns of racial segregation persist in Waterloo. Of the 20 cities in Iowa with populations exceeding 25,000, Waterloo ranks as the most segregated."

Many activists who participated in the original protests feel that Waterloo has remained the same. In 2015, The Huffington Post listed Waterloo as the 10th worst city for black Americans. The site noted that the city's black residents have a 24% unemployment rate compared to 3.9% for whites, giving Waterloo one of the highest black unemployment rates among Midwest cities. Waterloo still has a higher percentage of blacks than most Iowa cities.

In December 2012, Derrick Ambrose Jr. was shot by a police officer. Ambrose's family maintains he was unarmed, while the officer stated that he felt his life was in danger. A grand jury acquitted the officer. The shooting sparked outrage in the community.

Flood of 2008 

June 2008 saw the worst flooding the Waterloo – Cedar Falls area had ever recorded; other major floods include the Great Flood of 1993. The flood control system constructed in the 1970s–90s largely functioned as designed.

In areas not protected by the system, the Cedar River poured out of its banks and into parking lots, backyards and across the farmland surrounding the city. Although much damage was done, the larger downstream city of Cedar Rapids was much harder hit.

An area of the west side of the downtown and an area near the former Rath Packing facility were impacted, not directly by water coming from the river, but as a result of storm runoff draining toward the river but then being trapped on the back side of the flood levy system. These areas did not have lift stations or alternate pumping capacity sufficient to force this water back to the river side of the control system. Areas where lift stations had been constructed (Virden Creek and East 7th Street) to pump this storm runoff into the swollen river remained largely dry (the east and north sides of downtown). Several areas experienced water seeping into basements due to high water-table levels.

Historical Crests
According to the National Weather Service, the ten highest crests of the Cedar River recorded at East 7th Street in downtown Waterloo:

Crests reported in the 1960s and earlier were before completion of major flood control projects and therefore may not be directly comparable.

In September 2016, flood watches and warnings were put into effect for Waterloo and its surrounding cities. The crest was expected to just barely hit the height of the 2008 flood.

Geography 

The average elevation of Waterloo is 846 feet above sea level. The population density is 1101 people per square mile, considered low for an urban area.

Climate 
Waterloo has a humid continental climate zone (Köppen classification Dfa), typical of the state of Iowa, and is part of USDA Plant Hardiness zone 5a. On average, there are 22 nights annually with a low at or below , 58 days annually with a high at or below freezing, and 16 days with a high at or above . As the mean first and last occurrence of freezing temperatures is October 1 and April 29, respectively, this allows for a growing season of 154 days.

The driest months are October 1952 and November 1954 with trace amounts each.

Demographics

2020 census
As of the census of 2020, the population was 67,314. The racial makeup of the city was 72.4% White, 17.3% Black or African American, 2.5% Asian, 0.5% Pacific Islander, 0.3% Native American, and 3.3% from other races or two or more races. Ethnically, the population was 7.1% Hispanic or Latino of any race.

2010 census
As of the census of 2010, there were 68,406 people, 28,607 households, 17,233 families residing in the city. The racial makeup of the city was 77.3% White, 15.5% African American, 0.3% Native American, 1.1% Asian, 0.3% Pacific Islander, 2.6% from other races, and 3.0% from two or more races. Hispanic or Latino people of any race were 5.6% of the population.

There were 28,607 households, of which 29.9% had children under the age of 18 living with them, 40.3% were married couples living together, 14.9% had a female householder with no husband present, 5.1% had a male householder with no wife present, and 39.8% were non-families. 31.6% of all households were made up of individuals, and 11.2% had someone living alone who was 65 years of age or older. The average household size was 2.35 and the average family size was 2.95.

The median age in the city was 35.9 years. 23.7% of residents were under the age of 18; 10.4% were between the ages of 18 and 24; 26.4% were from 25 to 44; 25.5% were from 45 to 64; and 14% were 65 years of age or older. The gender makeup of the city was 48.4% male and 51.6% female.

Metropolitan area 
The Waterloo-Cedar Falls Metropolitan Statistical Area consists of Black Hawk, Bremer, and Grundy counties. The area had a 2000 census population of 163,706 and a 2008 estimated population of 164,220.

Waterloo is next to Cedar Falls, home to the University of Northern Iowa. Small suburbs include Evansdale, Hudson, Raymond, Elk Run Heights, Gilbertville, and Washburn.

The largest employers in the Waterloo/Cedar Falls MSA, according to the Cedar Valley Regional Partnership of Iowa, as of 2021 include (in order): John Deere, Tyson Fresh Meats, the University of Northern Iowa, Omega Cabinetry, Bertch Cabinet, Target Regional Distribution Center, Croell Redi Mix, Cuna Mutrual, and CBE Companies.

Arts and culture

The Cedar Valley Arboretum & Botanic Gardens is a  public garden located directly east of Hawkeye Community College.  Admission is $5/adult and $2/child, under five and members are free.

Lost Island Waterpark, which opened in 2001, is one of the highest rated waterparks in the United States and was joined in 2022 by Lost Island Theme Park.

The National Cattle Congress is held in Waterloo in September.

Silos & Smokestacks National Heritage Area
Silos & Smokestacks National Heritage Area (SSNHA) preserves and tells the story of American agriculture and its global significance through partnerships and activities that celebrate the land, people, and communities of the area. SSNHA is one of 49 federally designated National Heritage Areas and is an Affiliated Area of the National Park Service. Through the development of a network of 113 partner sites, programs and events, SSNHA's mission is to interpret farm life, agribusiness and rural communities-past and present. Waterloo partner sites include the Waterloo Center for the Arts and the Grout Museum. The SSNHA office is located in the Fowler Building, Suite 2, 604 Lafayette Street.

Waterloo Center for the Arts
The Waterloo Center for the Arts (WCA) is a regional center for visual and performance arts. It is owned and operated by the City of Waterloo with oversight by the advisory Waterloo Cultural and Arts Commission.  The center is located at 225 Commercial Street. It is also an anchor for the Waterloo Cultural and Arts District (a State of Iowa designation).

The permanent collection at the WCA includes the largest collection of Haitian art in the country, Midwest Regionalist art (including works by Grant Wood and Thomas Hart Benton), Mexican folk art, international folk art, American decorative arts, and public art.

President Barack Obama gave a speech here on August 14, 2012, during the 2012 presidential campaign. Originally scheduled for 7:45 pm, the speech was delayed by about 15 minutes, when Obama made an unannounced stop in neighboring Cedar Falls for a beer at a pub.

Included in the WCA is the Phelps Youth Pavilion (PYP), which opened in 2009. The PYP is an interactive children's museum. PYP provides additional gallery and studio space.

The Riverloop Amphitheater, completed in 2011, is an outdoor plaza and amphitheater available to rent for events and weddings. The Riverloop Amphitheater also is home to Mark's Park, a water park playground open to the public.

The WCA also houses the Waterloo Community Playhouse, the oldest community theatre in Iowa (operating since 1916), and the Black Hawk Children's Theatre, that started in 1964, then, merged with the Waterloo Community Playhouse in 1982. Both perform in the Hope Martin Theatre, which opened in 1965. The theatre's administrative offices are located across the street in the historic Walker Building.

Grout Museum District

Established in 1932, the district started with an endowment set up in the will of Henry W. Grout. The district is a nonprofit educational entity that is active in engaging the students and all people from the surrounding communities. It is accredited by the American Alliance of Museums.

The Grout Museum of History and Science, the first museum which would grow into the museum district, was displayed for many years in the building that was the local YMCA. The current building was completed and opened to the public as a not-for-profit museum in 1956.

The Sullivan Brothers Iowa Veterans Museum was opened in November 2008 at a cost of $11 million, funded in part by a citizens' grassroots campaign.

The Rensselaer Russell House is at 520 W. 3rd Street. Built in 1858, it is listed on the National Register of Historic Places. Rensselaer and Caroline Russell built the house utilizing Italianate architecture in 1861 for $5,878.83.

The Carl A. and Peggy J. Bluedorn Science Imaginarium opened in 1993 and provides both interactive exhibits and formal demonstrations in various fields of science.

The Snowden House is a two-story brick Victorian era house listed on the National Register of Historic Places was built in 1875. The house was once used as the Waterloo Woman's Club.

Library
Waterloo has one central public library. For the fiscal year ending June 30, 2020, there were 92,342 patron visits resulting in a circulation of 199,249 items. The total collection consisted of 607,583 items. The library's reference services, supported by 4.75 FTE librarians, answered 28,970 questions. Its 99 public access computers provided over 30,047 sessions for patrons and the library's wireless network hosted 30,692 sessions. (Waterloo Public Library Annual Report). .

The library is governed by a board of trustees, nominated by the city mayor and confirmed by the city council: John Berry, Larry Bjortomt, Ivy Hagedorn, Kathleen Wernimont and Cindy Wells. The library is directed by Nick Rossman, MLS.<>

The Waterloo Public Library is in a renovated Great Depression era building that served as a post office and federal building (Waterloo Public Library history ). The building was renovated in the late 1970s for use as a library. In 2011, the Waterloo Public Library celebrated 30 years at its Commercial Street location.

Two New Deal-funded murals by artist Edgar Britton are on display at the library. Exposition is an image of the National Cattle Congress, and Holiday is of a picnic.

Pop culture 
The 2015 film Carol uses Waterloo in a major plot point.

The independent film Bros uses Waterloo as its main setting.

Government 

Waterloo is administered by the mayor and council system of government. One council member is elected from each of Waterloo's five wards, and two are elected at-large. The current mayor is Quentin Hart. He is the city's first black mayor.

The city holds elections to elect its mayor and city council every two years, in odd-numbered years. Mayoral elections are held every two years, meanwhile each city council seat is up for grabs every four years.

Education 
Hawkeye Community College is located in Waterloo. Neighboring Cedar Falls is home to the University of Northern Iowa.

Almost all of the city is within the Waterloo Community School District. The three public high schools in the city are Waterloo West High School, Waterloo East High School, and Expo High School. Additionally, a portion of the city is within the Cedar Falls Community School District.

Waterloo's private high schools are Waterloo Christian School and Columbus Catholic High School, which is supported by the Catholic parishes of Waterloo and Cedar Falls.  Waterloo Christian is a non-denominational college preparatory school located on the grounds of Walnut Ridge Baptist Church. The school's colors are green and yellow, and its mascot is the "Regent." Columbus' mascot is the "Sailor", a connection to the school's namesake Christopher Columbus, and its colors are green and white.

There is also a wide array of elementary and junior high schools in the area, with open enrollment available.

Media

Radio
FM stations

AM stations

Television
2 KGAN 2 (CBS) – located in Cedar Rapids
7 KWWL 7 (NBC, The CW on DT2, Me-TV on DT3) – located in Waterloo
9 KCRG 9 (ABC) – located in Cedar Rapids
12 KIIN 12 (PBS/Iowa PBS) – located in Iowa City
17 K17ET 17 / K31PO-D 44 (TBN)
20 KWKB 20 (This TV) – located in Iowa City
28 KFXA 28 (Fox) – located in Cedar Rapids
32 KRIN 32 (PBS/Iowa PBS) - located in Waterloo
40 KFXB-TV 40 (CTN) – located in Dubuque
48 KPXR-TV 48 (Ion) – located in Cedar Rapids

Print
 The Courier, daily newspaper
 The Cedar Valley What Not, weekly advertiser

Infrastructure

Transportation 
Waterloo is located at the north end of Interstate 380. U.S. Highways 20, 63, and 218 and Iowa Highway 21, also run through the metropolitan area. The Avenue of the Saints runs through Waterloo.

American Airlines provides non-stop air service to and from Chicago from the Waterloo Regional Airport as of April 3, 2012. As of October 27, 2014, American Airlines runs two flights to/from Chicago O'Hare (ORD). Departures to Chicago are early morning and mid/late afternoon. Arrivals are early/mid-afternoon and evening.

Waterloo is served by a metropolitan bus system (MET), which serves most areas of Cedar Falls and Waterloo. Most routes meet at the central bus station in downtown Waterloo. The system operates Monday through Saturday. During the week the earliest bus is at 5:45 am from downtown Waterloo, and the last bus arrives downtown at 6:40 pm. Service is limited on Saturdays.

Waterloo is served by one daily intercity bus arrival and departure to Chicago and Des Moines, provided by Burlington Trailways. New service to and from Mason City and Minneapolis/St. Paul provided by Jefferson Lines started in the fall of 2009.

There are currently five taxi operators in Waterloo and Cedar Falls: First Call, Yellow, City Cab, Cedar Valley Cab, and Dolly's Taxi.

The Chicago Central railroad runs through Waterloo.

Utilities 
The MidAmerican Energy Company supplies Waterloo with electricity and natural gas. The Waterloo Water Works supplies potable water with a capacity of 50,400,000 GPD (gallons per day) with an average use of 13,400,000 GPD and a peak use of 28,800,000 GPD. News reports indicate that 18.5% of the system's output in 2013, or 851 million gallons, was unaccounted for. Sanitation service (sewage) is operated by the city of Waterloo, with a capacity of 36,500,000 GPD and an average use of 14,000,000 GPD.

Healthcare 
Waterloo is home to two hospitals, Mercy One Waterloo Medical Center, which has 366 beds, and Unity Point Health 
Allen Memorial Hospital, with 234 beds. Neighboring Cedar Falls is home to Sartori Memorial Hospital, with 83 beds. The Waterloo-Cedar Falls metropolitan area has 295 physicians, 69 dentists, 52 chiropractors, 24 vision specialists and 21 nursing/retirement homes.

Notable people 

Julie Adams, actress in Creature from the Black Lagoon, many other movies and TV series
Michele Bachmann (born 1956), former Minnesota Congresswoman
David Barrett, cornerback for New York Jets and Arizona Cardinals
William Birenbaum (1923–2010), college administrator who served as president of Antioch College
Horace Boies (1827–1923), Governor of Iowa, 1890–1894
Bob Bowlsby, Commissioner, Big 12 Conference (2012 present) and Stanford University (2006–2012) and University of Iowa (1991–2005) athletic director
Jack Bruner, MLB player for Chicago White Sox and St. Louis Browns
Don Denkinger, Major League Baseball umpire, made famous for "the call" in Game 6 of the 1985 World Series
Adam DeVine, star of TV program Workaholics
 Loren Doxey, medical doctor accused of murder in 1909 but never tried
Pearlretta DuPuy (1871–1939), zither player and club leader
Rich Folkers, MLB player for New York Mets, St. Louis Cardinals, San Diego Padres, and Milwaukee Brewers
Travis Fulton, mixed martial arts fighter, most career wins in the history of the sport
Dan Gable, Olympic wrestling champion, multiple NCAA champion from Iowa State University, and distinguished collegiate coach
John Wayne Gacy (1942–1994), serial killer
Kim Guadagno, First Lieutenant Governor of New Jersey
Mike Haffner, professional football player
Nikole Hannah-Jones, investigative journalist formerly with ProPublica, now staff reporter at The New York Times and 2020 Pulitzer Prize winner for Commentary Writing
Lou Henry Hoover (1874–1944), wife of President Herbert Hoover and First Lady of the United States, 1929–1933
MarTay Jenkins (born 1975), NFL wide receiver and kick returner
Anesa Kajtazovic, Iowa State Representative, youngest woman elected to Iowa Legislature and first Bosnian American member of the legislature 
Arthur R. Kelly (1878–1959), architect
Chris Klieman (born 1967), football head coach, Kansas State; born in Waterloo
Bonnie Koloc (born 1946), singer and folk musician
John Hooker Leavitt, banker, state senator, son of Roger Hooker Leavitt
Jason Lewis, born 1955, talk radio host and U.S. Congressman for Minnesota's 2nd congressional district
Jack Little, songwriter, born in Great Britain, raised in Waterloo
J.J. Moses (born 1979), NFL wide receiver and current Director of Player Engagement for Houston Texans
Charles W. Mullan (1845–1919), Iowa Attorney General
Larry Nemmers, NFL referee
Thunderbolt Patterson, professional wrestler
Joe Pelton, poker player
Don Perkins, running back for Dallas Cowboys
Cal Petersen, ice hockey goaltender
Gordon Randolph (1915–1999), newspaper journalist
Alfred C. Richmond, retired U.S. Coast Guard commandant
Mike Ritland, US Navy SEAL
Reggie Roby (1961–2005), punter for University of Iowa Hawkeyes and five NFL teams, three-time Pro-Bowler
Zud Schammel (born 1910), NFL guard for the Green Bay Packers
Sean Schemmel (born 1968), American voice actor for. Best known as the voice of Son Goku in Funimation’s English dub for the Dragon Ball series.
Duane Slick, (born 1961) fine art painter and professor
Tom Smith, football player
Vivian Smith, suffragist
Paul Sohl, United States Navy Rear Admiral
Tracie Spencer (born 1976), winner of Star Search in 1987 as a singer, recorded music across many genres, acted and modeled
Darren Sproles, running back for NFL's San Diego Chargers, New Orleans Saints, and Philadelphia Eagles
Suzanne Stephens (born 1946), clarinetist
The Sullivan Brothers, five sons who died together on the USS Juneau during World War II
Corey Taylor, vocalist from Slipknot and Stone Sour
Michael Townley, assassin
Mike van Arsdale, mixed martial artist, signed with the UFC
Mona Van Duyn (1921–2004), winner of 1991 Pulitzer Prize for Poetry and 1992–1993 U.S. Poet Laureate; born in Waterloo
Emily West (born 1981), country music singer/songwriter, signed with Capitol Records
Nancy Youngblut, actress

Pat McLaughlin (born 1950), Grammy-nominated songwriter and musician, collaborated with John Prine, Dan Auerbach and many others
Bruce B. Zager; Former Justice of the Iowa Supreme Court

Twin towns – sister cities

Waterloo is twinned with:
 Giessen, Germany (1981)
 Targovishte, Bulgaria (2002)
 Harbel, Liberia (2019)

See also

Impact of the COVID-19 pandemic on the meat industry in the United States

References

External links

 City website
 Waterloo Convention and Visitors Bureau
 Waterloo Chamber of Commerce
 City Data – comprehensive statistical data and more about Waterloo, Iowa
Historic
 Panoramic photographs from Library of Congress

 
Cities in Iowa
Cities in Black Hawk County, Iowa
County seats in Iowa
Waterloo – Cedar Falls metropolitan area
1845 establishments in Iowa Territory